Massone S.A., also Instituto Massone S.A., is a pharmaceutical company based in Buenos Aires, Argentina.

Products
Among others Massone produces hMG (human menopausal gonadotropins or menotropins). Menotropins are extracted from the urine of postmenopausal women and used in infertility therapy.

References

External links
 Official web site

Pharmaceutical companies of Argentina
Manufacturing companies based in Buenos Aires
Argentine brands